Sandra Konstance Nygård Borch  (born 23 April 1988) is a Norwegian politician currently serving as the minister of agriculture and food since 2021. A member of the Centre Party, she served as the leader of the Centre Youth from 2011 to 2013, while simultaneously serving as a deputy MP from her home constituency of Troms from 2009 to 2013. She was elected a permanent representative in 2017.

Personal life and education
Borch was born in Lavangen on 23 April 1988. She graduated in jurisprudence from the University of Tromsø in 2012.

Political career

Parliament
Borch was elected a deputy member from Troms for the Centre Party in 2009, and later an ordinary member to the Storting for the period 2017–2021. In the Storting, she was a member of the Standing Committee on Energy and the Environment from 2017 to 2021. She was re-elected to the Storting for the period 2021–2025. While being a member of the Støre cabinet from 2021, Ivar B. Prestbakmo met in her place.

Youth league
She was leader of the Troms branch of the Centre Youth from 2007 to 2009, before she became a member of the Centre Youth’s central board. She then served as the international relations leader from 2009 to 2010, and organisational deputy leader from 2010 to 2011.

In November 2011, she was elected the new leader of the Centre Youth with 85 votes against her opponent Lars Vangen’s 80.

In October 2012, the Centre Youth asked in a letter to the Centre Party's central board that the party should challenge the leadership style of Liv Signe Navarsete after she had become loudly angry at Borch. The background was that Borch had the same day opened for Ola Borten Moe as a possible future leader of the Centre Party. After a debate at a central board meeting five days later, and an unreserved apology from Navarsete, Borch expressed that she had full confidence in her.

As leader of the Centre Youth, Borch opened up for a new debate and oil extraction in Lofoten and Vesterålen. The proposal was however voted down at the Centre Youth’s congress in November 2012.

Borch notably took a stand against cyber bullying after she experienced it herself surrounding her height. In a blog post, she expressed disgust with anonymous bullies and called them cowards. She further expressed that cyber bullying had become a big and widespread problem in society, and called for it to be put on the agenda.

In September 2013, Borch announced that she would not seek re-election as leader, despite having previously indicated that she wanted to. She cited her reason being that she disagreed with the mother party’s business policies. In November, she was succeeded by Erling Laugsand.

Minister of Agriculture and Food
She was appointed minister of agriculture in Støre's Cabinet on 14 October 2021.

In one of her first cases as minister, Borch stopped the sale of the Løken farm in Volbu, Valdres. Borch stated that the ministry would work together with Øystre Slidre municaplity to find a more appropriate ownership and operation of the farm.

Borch accused her predecessor, Olaug Bollestad, to not have dealt with compensation to the agricultural sector properly before the previous government's departure. She notably pointed to the budget priority in the state budget that didn't let of any costs to deal with its problems. She further stated: "But we must also keep in mind that there are many farmers out there who experience great financial insecurity because they have not been invested in the last eight years".

On 8 December, she and state secretary Aleksander Øren Heen from the Ministry of the Climate and Environment met with mayors, local representatives and affected traders in surrounding areas of Hardangervidda, affected by a recent wave of scrapie decease. Of the meeting, Borch said: "It is demanding to deal with this serious animal disease. I am therefore pleased that we have had a good meeting with mayors in the Hardangervidda area, local government and other affected traders. It is important for me to listen to their input before the Minister of Climate and the Environment and I soon will decide whether it will be necessary to carry out an extraordinary removal of wild reindeer in the winter of 2021/22".

After the government announced that they would be paying parts of the electricity prices for the greenhouse industry, Borch wrote: "The government has decided that the greenhouse industry will be compensated for the higher electricity prices.  We have worked for a long time with this and taken the input from the industry very seriously". She later went on to say: "The greenhouse industry is important for the self-sufficiency row in Norway and facilitates more green production. We have worked intensely to get the scheme in place".

On 21 December, Borch suggested that food chain companies should end their price war before Christmas, after multiple of their products had seen an increase in prices. She notably stated: "I think it's unusual to wage price war on seasonal goods in the way that the chains still do. We have not seen it as much on pork ribs this year as in previous years, but I really think this is unusual". She also mentioned that she was in "good dialog" with the companies, but also said that they had to set better prices on food they get from farmers.

On 27 December, it was announced in a press release that she and minister of fisheries Bjørnar Skjæran would put forward a Storting report addressing animal welfare. In the press release, Borch said: "In the work on the report, we will take a closer look at the development in Norwegian livestock production and all the knowledge we now have about animal welfare. We will consider whether it is necessary to make changes to ensure better regulations". It's been 20 years since last time animal welfare was evaluated. Her and Skjæran's ministries will work together with other relevant ministries in order to present the report in 2024.

During autumn of 2021, farmers' organisations and the state had agreed on compensation to farmers at 754 million NOK due to price increases on fertilizers and other goods. In January 2022, with the agricultural settlement negotiations looming, farmers's organisations asked Borch to take the initiative to start additional negotiations. Borch rejected the proposal, reasoning that additional negotiations had already taken place, and that they had then agreed to return to increased expenses in the agricultural settlement come spring.

Borch presented the government electricity farmers' package on 17 January. The package  includes that the government will pay for 55% of the bill if the electricity price rises above 70 kroner per kilowatt hour in the morning of December and 80% through January to March. Borch stated: "I am concerned that the money to the farmers will be paid out as soon as possible, and the Norwegian Directorate of Agriculture aims to start with payments towards the end of February".

Borch received backlash from the Liberal Party and animal welfare organisations after suggesting that the wolf hunting period could be extended beyond the current one between 1 January and 15 February. The Liberals' Ola Elvestuen reacted, saying: "There is no reason to extend the felling period. It is set for 15 February to avoid hunting during the mating and breeding season for wolves.  Animal welfare must take precedence over the government's desire to hunt.  These are stable flocks in established territories.  It does no harm if any wolf is still allowed to live". The animal welfare organisation NOAH, cited: "The Ministry itself has stated that this deadline is set for animal welfare reasons. Then one can not suddenly say that it no longer applies".

As a result of the ongoing war in Ukraine, Borch announced a new guarantee of profitability for farmers who want to sow food grains in Norway. She also noted that the consequences for consumers would be the prices. She also opened for that the government and state would take a larger share of the bill for the food - instead of collecting it through increased prices to consumers. This would also be a part of the agricultural settlement.

Borch toured farms in Southern Norway to hear farmers' needs in preparations for the agricultural settlement that would start in week 17. She expressed that the settlement negotiations "my most important exam", and went on to say that the government would be contributing to economic safety for farmers. She also expressed sympathy for farmers' concerns.

Borch negotiated her first agricultural settlement from late April until 16 May, when she and the Norwegian Agrarian Association reached an agreed settlement of 10,9 million kroner. Borch called the settlement "important" and emphasised that it had been important for the government to start a raise of farmers' income, stating: "This signal is important to give to regain optimism in the industry and to make the industry believe that the government wants to invest in them".

In early July, Borch encouraged grocery store giants to take their share of the food bill regarding the raise in food prices. She also emphasised that customers shouldn't pay everything themselves and that the giants had an important responsibility at present.

In September, she spoke out about the possibility of a Centre Party exit from government and low opinion polling, saying: "It's not good and I understand the frustration out there. At the same time, it has been a demanding time to take over.  
I also know that it is too easy to say that the crises are the explanation for that, but we know that it has raised political debates that have been demanding to stand in". She further stated that there would be difficult times ahead, noting that the crisis can take much time for individual ministers.

With the state budget for 2023 being presented on 6 October, Borch announced that the government would be severing state funding to NOAH, an animal protection organisation. She expressed that it wasn't the government's ambition to nullify NOAH's funding, and added that they were prioritising other member organisations. The organisation's academic director, Siri Martinsen, expressed that the cut in funding seemed like a punishment reaction in response to the organisation rating the Centre Party as the worst party in regards to animal welfare just before the 2021 election, something Borch denied.

On 12 December, she met with the Reindeer Management Board to discuss grazing conflicts, loss of reindeer to predators, follow-up to the Fosen verdict, risk of scurvy and changes to the Reindeer Management Act. 

In January 2023, she pledged to bring the reindeer field's view to the government regarding the Fosen case. She also expressed that the case was an area dispute and furthermore that such issues are difficult to solve. She also expressed that her ministry has good dialogue with the reindeer industry after visiting Fosen herself.

In February, she was denied to travel to Svalbard from Tromsø after having forgotten her passport at her ministerial apartment. Per law, it's mandatory to either have a passport or ID in order to visit Svalbard. Borch admitted to the slip up, while a state secretary was dispatched to retrieve her passport back in Oslo. She was scheduled to visit the Svalbard Global Seed Vault for it's 15th anniversary celebration.

References

1988 births
Living people
University of Tromsø alumni
Centre Party (Norway) politicians
Members of the Storting
People from Lavangen
Ministers of Agriculture and Food of Norway
Women government ministers of Norway
21st-century Norwegian women politicians
21st-century Norwegian politicians
Women members of the Storting